Little Grassy Lake is a 1,200-acre (4.8 km²) reservoir in southern Illinois, created by the damming of Little Grassy Creek, a tributary of Crab Orchard Lake and the Big Muddy River.  Most of the lake is located in Williamson County, southeast of Carbondale, Illinois.  The lake is accessible from Giant City Road out of Carbondale, Illinois.  Two arms of the lake penetrate into adjacent Jackson County.  The lake is managed by the U.S. Fish and Wildlife Service as part of the Crab Orchard National Wildlife Refuge.

History 
Little Grassy Lake was built in 1940 as part of federal relief efforts surrounding recovery from the Great Depression.  The surrounding hills, forested with oak and hickory trees, did not offer good farming potential, and the federal government condemned the farms to construct the lake.

In 1959, activity around the lake increased when the Illinois Department of Natural Resources (IDNR) chose a land parcel near the Little Grassy dam as the site for its primary warm-water hatchery for the production of fish such as largemouth bass, bluegill, channel catfish, and redear sunfish for stocking.  , 15.0 million fingerlings are produced annually.

The lake today
Little Grassy Lake is managed for warmwater fishing, with largemouth bass, bluegill, channel catfish, and crappie stocked and caught.  There is a power limit on the lake, with motors restricted to 10 h.p. or less.  A U.S. Fish and Wildlife Service permit is required for use of the lake.  A campground and marina operates during fishing season.

Little Grassy Lake is IDNR's sole catfish hatchery.  For catfish, the spawning and fish maturation process requires at least one year, with mature fish spawning on or around June 1; the fish take at least 13 months to grow to a "nonvulnerable" length of 8 inches (20 cm) and are typically ready for delivery to their new homes in July of the following summer.  IDNR distributes Little Grassy catfish to 220 separate Illinois waterways.

A stretch of spillway directly below the Little Grassy dam, measuring 0.2 miles (0.3 km) in length, is a noted whitewater spot, rated at Class II-IV depending on spillway flow conditions.  The spillway tends to operate during rain or snow meltwater runoff events in winter and early spring.

The Pine Ridge Boy Scout Reservation is also situated on the Northeastern edge of the lake, almost a mile away from the dam.

References

External links
 Shawnee National Forest
 Campground/marina

Reservoirs in Illinois
Protected areas of Jackson County, Illinois
Protected areas of Williamson County, Illinois
Bodies of water of Jackson County, Illinois
Bodies of water of Williamson County, Illinois
1940 establishments in Illinois